The courts of Northern Ireland are the civil and criminal courts responsible for the administration of justice in Northern Ireland: they are constituted and governed by the law of Northern Ireland.

Prior to the partition of Ireland, Northern Ireland was part of the courts system of Ireland. After partition, Northern Ireland's courts became separate from the court system of the Republic of Ireland. Northern Ireland continues to have a separate legal system to the rest of the United Kingdom. There are exceptions to that rule, such as in immigration and military law, for which there is a unified judicial system for the whole United Kingdom.

To overcome problems resulting from the intimidation of jurors and witnesses, the right to a jury trial in Northern Ireland was suspended for certain terrorist offences in 1972, and the so-called "Diplock courts" were introduced to try people charged with paramilitary activities. Diplock courts are common in Northern Ireland for crimes connected to terrorism.

Administration of the courts is the responsibility of the Northern Ireland Courts and Tribunals Service.

Supreme Court of the United Kingdom 

The Supreme Court of the United Kingdom was created by the Constitutional Reform Act 2005. It took its duties up on 1 October 2009.  It is the final court of appeal for cases originating in all parts of the United Kingdom, other than Scottish criminal cases.

The Supreme Court has taken over the appellate jurisdiction formerly vested in the House of Lords.

Court of Judicature 

The Court of Judicature of Northern Ireland is constituted by the Judicature (Northern Ireland) Act 1978. It is a collective body of the superior courts of Northern Ireland, and consists of the following courts:

The Court of Appeal in Northern Ireland (Court of Appeal, formally "His Majesty’s Court of Appeal in Northern Ireland")
The High Court of Justice in Northern Ireland (High Court, formally "His Majesty's High Court of Justice in Northern Ireland")
The Crown Court

Until 1 October 2009, the name of the court was the Supreme Court of Judicature: this was changed to remove the word 'Supreme' on 1 October 2009 when the relevant provisions of the Constitutional Reform Act 2005 came into force establishing the Supreme Court of the United Kingdom.

Court of Appeal 
The Court of Appeal is the highest court in Northern Ireland. Appeal from the Court of Appeal lies to the Supreme Court of the United Kingdom. The Court of Appeal hears appeals from the Crown Court, High Court, county courts, courts of summary jurisdiction and tribunals.

A Court of Criminal Appeal existed from 1930 to 1978, when its functions were merged into the new general court of appeal.

High Court 

The High Court of Northern Ireland is split into three divisions: King's Bench Division, Family Division and Chancery Division. The High Court is located in the Royal Courts of Justice, Belfast.

Crown Court 
The Crown Court hears more serious criminal cases. These are indictable offences and "either way" offences which are committed for trial in the Crown Court rather than the magistrates' courts.

County courts 

The county courts are the main civil courts. While higher-value cases are heard in the High Court, the county courts hear a wide range of civil actions, consumer claims, and appeals from magistrates' courts. The county courts are called family care centres when hearing proceedings brought under the Children (Northern Ireland) Order 1995 and appeals from the family proceedings courts. There were seven county court divisions in Northern Ireland until 2016, when a unified model was adopted.

Subordinate courts 
Below the High Court are several classes of courts. Magistrates' courts (including youth courts, family proceedings courts and domestic proceedings courts) hear less-serious criminal cases and conduct preliminary hearings in more serious criminal cases. They are divided into 21 petty sessions districts. The Crown Court hears all serious criminal cases which are committed to trial. When sitting as family proceedings courts the magistrates' courts hear proceedings brought under the Children (Northern Ireland) Order 1995.

Additionally, there is the Enforcement of Judgments Office, and coroners' courts, which investigate the circumstances of sudden, violent or unnatural deaths.

See also 
List of courts in Northern Ireland
List of Lords Justices of Appeal of Northern Ireland
List of High Court judges of Northern Ireland
List of judges of the Supreme Court of the United Kingdom
Courts of the Republic of Ireland / Judiciary of the Republic of Ireland
Courts of England and Wales / Judiciary of England and Wales
Courts of Scotland / Judiciary of Scotland
Law of the United Kingdom

References

Further reading
Organisation of justice in Northern Ireland (pdf)
The Court Structure in Northern Ireland (pdf)

External links 
 Northern Ireland Courts and Tribunals Service official website

 
Law of Northern Ireland
Northern